A target drone is an unmanned aerial vehicle, generally remote controlled, usually used in the training of anti-aircraft crews.

One of the earliest drones was the British DH.82 Queen Bee, a variant of the Tiger Moth trainer aircraft operational from 1935. Its name led to the present term "drone".

In their simplest form, target drones often resemble radio-controlled model aircraft. More modern drones may use countermeasures, radar, and similar systems to mimic manned aircraft.

More advanced drones are made from large, older missiles which have had their warheads removed.

In the United Kingdom, obsolete Royal Air Force and Royal Navy jet and propeller-powered aircraft (such as the Fairey Firefly, Gloster Meteor and de Havilland Sea Vixen used at RAE Llanbedr between the 1950s and 1990s) have also been modified into remote-controlled drones, but such modifications are costly.  With a much larger budget, the U.S. military has been more likely to convert retired aircraft or older versions of still serving aircraft (e.g., QF-4 Phantom II and QF-16 Fighting Falcon) into remotely piloted targets for US Air Force, US Navy and US Marine Corps use as Full-Scale Aerial Targets.

List of target drones

Purpose built

 Aerial Target
 Airspeed Queen Wasp
 de Havilland Queen Bee
 DRDO Abhyas
 DRDO Fluffy
 DRDO Lakshya
 DRDO Ulka
 Denel Dynamics Skua
 Meggitt Banshee
 Aisheng Drone-2
 GAF Jindivik
 GAF Turana
 MQM-170
 TAI Şimşek
 Lockheed AQM-60 Kingfisher
 BQM-34 Firebee
 BQM-74 Chukar
 BQM-167 Skeeter
 Nord CT41
 Karrar (UCAV)
 NCSIST Spark

Conversions

 Curtiss Queen Seamew
 de Havilland Vampire
 Fairey Queen
 Miles Queen Martinet
 QB-17 Flying Fortress
 QT-33 Shooting Star
 QB-47 Stratojet
 QF-86 Sabre
 QF-100 Super Sabre
 QF-102 and PQM-102 Delta Dagger
 QF-106 Delta Dart
 QF-4 Phantom II
 QF-16 Fighting Falcon
 QF-9 Cougar

References

 
Targeting (warfare)